The 2020 Northern Arizona Lumberjacks football team represented Northern Arizona University in the 2020–21 NCAA Division I FCS football season. They were led by 2nd-year head coach Chris Ball and played their home games at the Walkup Skydome. They played as members of the Big Sky Conference.

Previous season

The Lumberjacks finished the 2019 season 4–8, 2–6 in Big Sky play to finish in a five-way tie for ninth place.

Preseason

Polls
On July 23, 2020, during the virtual Big Sky Kickoff, the Lumberjacks were predicted to finish seventh in the Big Sky by the coaches and ninth by the media.

Schedule
Northern Arizona released their full schedule on January 13, 2020. The Lumberjacks had a game scheduled against Arizona State, which was later canceled before the start of the 2020 season.

Despite being a Big Sky opponent, the game against Eastern Washington on September 19 will not count towards the Big Sky Conference standings.

References

Northern Arizona
Northern Arizona Lumberjacks football seasons
Northern Arizona Lumberjacks football